Vilina Pećina is a cave and a karst resurgence wellspring in Dinaric Alps karst of Bosnia and Herzegovina, also previously known from research descriptions of older date as "Vilić Pećina", such as one from 1896, conducted by Austria-Hungary geologists.

Geographically, it is located on the northern border of Cerničko Polje, at an elevation of  asl, just below and less than 100 meters to the west of Ključ village, Gacko municipality, Eastern Herzegovina region of Bosnia and Herzegovina.
Geologically, object is located on the edge of Cerničko polje (karstic field) floor, at the thrust fault zone (overthrust), where eocene flysch and limestone make tectonic contact. 
In hydrogeological terms wellspring belongs to intermittent B-type (allogenic) resurgence karst spring. The wellspring cave entrance is very large with characteristic vertically elongated shape. 
 
Vilina Pećina spring is one of the two sources of the short sinking river Ključka Rijeka. There are also many other karst springs along the entire length of Cerničko Polje, mostly situated on its edges.

Also see
List of caves in Bosnia and Herzegovina
List of karst springs in Bosnia and Herzegovina

References

External links
 Centar za krš, Sarajevo

Geology of Bosnia and Herzegovina
Caves of Bosnia and Herzegovina
Karst caves of Bosnia and Herzegovina
Karst springs of Bosnia and Herzegovina
Springs of Bosnia and Herzegovina
Gacko